Sheikh Hasina National Institute of Burn and Plastic Surgery (SHNIBPS) is a hospital dedicated for burn and plastic surgery situated in Dhaka, Bangladesh. It is regarded as the largest burn and plastic surgical care center in the world.

History 
In 1986, the first burn unit was started in the country with six beds by country's first plastic surgeon Prof. Dr. Mohammad Shahidullah in Dhaka Medical College Hospital. The number of beds was increased to 50 in 2003 under supervision of Dr. Samanta Lal Sen. Later, bed number was increased to 100.

In 2013, the number of beds was increased to 300.

In November 2015, the Executive Committee of the National Economic Council (ECNEC) approved the project for establishment of the institute. On April 6, 2016, Sheikh Hasina laid the foundation stone for the institute. She also inaugurated the hospital on October 24, 2018. It formally started functioning from July 4, 2019.

Hospital structure  
The hospital building is a 18-storey structure equipped with rooftop helipad and a ground parking facility for 180 vehicles. It has three blocks for three separate units - Burn unit, Plastic surgery unit and academic wing. It was built at a cost of 912 crore bdt. The facility was constructed  by  Bangladesh Army's engineering core.

Facilities  
The institute has 500 bed, 22 ICU beds and 22 HDU facilities. It has 12 operation theatre with a postoperative unit.

Management 
Prof. Dr. Abul Kalam has been appointed as the first director of the institute in March 2020. He was also the project director of this institute. Dr. Samanta Lal Sen is the chief  coordinator of the institute.

Role in outbreaks 
Beside its regular activities, the hospital facility was used during Dengue outbreak in 2019 as an extension unit of Dhaka Medical College Hospital to accommodate large number of dengue patients. In 2020, this hospital was used as COVID-19 treatment center in collaboration with Dhaka Medical College Hospital.

References 

Hospitals in Dhaka
Plastic surgery organizations
2019 establishments in Bangladesh